Fort McPherson (Gwich'in: Teetł'it Zheh , at the head of the waters) is a hamlet located in the Inuvik Region of the Northwest Territories, Canada.

The First Nations people who make up the majority are Gwich'in (Teetł'it Gwich'in) and the two principal languages spoken are Gwichʼin and English.
Originally the site of a Hudson's Bay Company post the community was named for Murdoch McPherson.

Most people have vehicles and regularly make trips to either Inuvik, or Whitehorse, Yukon.

History 
Fort McPherson was the starting point of Francis Joseph Fitzgerald's famous tragic journey of "The Lost Patrol". All four men on the Patrol, including Fitzgerald, were buried at Fort McPherson on 28 March 1911. In 1938, the graves were cemented over into one large tomb (to the right of the flag pole in above image), with cement posts at the four corners connected by a chain. In the centre is a memorial to the Royal Northwest Mounted Police Patrol of 1910.

National Historic Site
In 1969, the area comprising the boundaries of the community of Fort McPherson, as it was mapped in 1898, was designated a National Historic Site of Canada, in recognition of the fact that the site had served as the principal Hudson's Bay Company trading post in the MacKenzie Delta region for over 50 years, and had been the first North-West Mounted Police post in the Western Arctic.

Transportation
Fort McPherson is accessible by road all year from Dawson City and Whitehorse, Yukon, with the exception of spring break-up and fall freeze-up on the Peel River. The community also has access to Inuvik via the Dempster Highway and crosses the Mackenzie River at Tsiigehtchic.

There is also a small airport at Fort McPherson, Fort McPherson Airport, that has seasonal flights to Inuvik (Mike Zubko) Airport on Aklak Air when the road across the Peel is closed. The former Fort McPherson Water Aerodrome was listed as closed in the 15 March 2007 Canada Flight Supplement.

Demographics

In the 2016 Census 695 people identified as Indigenous, 610 as First Nations, 15 as Métis, 20 as Inuit or Inuvialuit, 10 giving multiple or other aboriginal responses and 40 non-Aboriginal.

Climate 
Fort McPherson experiences a subarctic climate (Köppen climate classification Dfc).

See also
 List of municipalities in the Northwest Territories

References

Further reading

 Carefoot, E. I., and N. A. Lawrence. Utility Study Settlement of Ft. McPherson for Department of Public Works, Government of the Northwest Territories. Edmonton: Associated Engineering Services, 1972.
 Gallupe, Scott. Husky Lake, Fort McPherson Area Historic Hydrocarbon Exploration Investigation June 29, 1992. Inuvik, NT: Northern Affairs Program, Indian and Northern Affairs Canada, 1992.
 Kakfwi, Stephen. Literacy Program Funding, Fort McPherson. Yellowknife?, N.W.T.: Northwest Territories, Executive Council, 1991.
 Manitoba Free Press. Pemmican Made at Fort McPherson, a Hudson's Bay Company's Post Sixty-Five Miles Within the Arctic Circle and Two Thousand Nine Hundred and Seventy-Eight Miles Northwest of Winnipeg A Christmas Present from the Manitoba Free Press. Winnipeg: [s.n.], 1902. 
 Northern Engineering Services Company, and Canadian Arctic Gas Study Limited. Report on All-Weather Road from Prudhoe Bay, Alaska to Fort McPherson, N.W.T. [Canada?]: Northern Engineering Services, 1972.
 Northwest Territories, and Jane Gilmartin Gilchrist Collection (Newberry Library). Gwich'in Alphabet Posters Fort McPherson Dialect. [Fort McPherson]: Northwest Territories, Dept. of Education, Programs and Evaluation Branch, 1981.
 Ripley, Klohn & Leonoff International Limited. Community Granular Materials Inventory Fort McPherson, N.W.T. [s.l.]: Dept. of Indian Affairs and Northern Development, 1972.

External links

 Fort McPherson Hamlet website

Communities in the Inuvik Region
Gwich'in
Hudson's Bay Company forts
National Historic Sites in the Northwest Territories
Populated places in Arctic Canada
Hamlets in the Northwest Territories